Thomas J. Graves (September 29, 1866 – January 27, 1944) was a private serving in the United States Army during the Spanish–American War who received the Medal of Honor for bravery.

Biography
Graves was born September 29, 1866, in Milton, Indiana and joined the army from Columbus, Ohio in May 1898. He was sent to fight in the Spanish–American War with Company C, 17th U.S. Infantry as a private where he received the Medal of Honor for his actions. He was discharged in May 1901.

He died January 27, 1944, and is buried in Zion Lutheran Cemetery Pershing, Indiana.

Medal of Honor citation
Rank and organization: Private, Company C, 17th U.S. Infantry. Place and date: At El Caney, Cuba, 1 July 1898. Entered service at: Millville, Ind. Birth: Milton, Ind. Date of issue: 22 June 1899.

Citation:

Gallantly assisted in the rescue of the wounded from in front of the lines and under heavy fire from the enemy.

See also

List of Medal of Honor recipients for the Spanish–American War

References

External links

1866 births
1944 deaths
United States Army Medal of Honor recipients
United States Army soldiers
American military personnel of the Spanish–American War
Burials in Indiana
People from Wayne County, Indiana
Spanish–American War recipients of the Medal of Honor
Military personnel from Indiana